Muhammad Sadiq Ardestani (died 1721) is one of the Iranian Shia philosophers during Safavid period.

Life
Molla Muhammad Sadiq Ardestani, according to Henry Corbin, lived in the catastrophic period namely when Shah Sultan Hossein ruled out. his time coincided with siege of Isfahan by Afghans.

Works
Ardestani has two primarily works in Islamic philosophy. his main work is Hikmah sadiqiya (the author's personal
philosophy). this book has written by one of the pupil of Ardestani by the name of Mulla Hamzah Gilani. he had also glossary on The Book of Healing and some commentaries on Quran's surah.

Philosophical views
Aredestani, like molla Sadra, criticized Avicenna and Avicennans views. he, following Mulla Sadra, believes that the faculty of imagination is immaterial. according to Henry Corbin , Ardestani had difficulties when he was to explain the interconnection the universal soul with body.of course Ardestani try to solve the problem by the conception epiphany or tajalli.

See also
Muslim philosophers
molla Sadra

References

Bibliography

External links
http://isfahan.ir/ShowPage.aspx?page_=dorsaetoolsfame&lang=1&tempname=isfinternal&sub=48&PageID=548&PageIDF=0

Islamic philosophers
1721 deaths
17th-century writers of Safavid Iran
18th-century writers of Safavid Iran
17th-century Iranian philosophers
18th-century Iranian philosophers